Bočac Lake is an artificial lake of Republika Srpska, Bosnia and Herzegovina. It is located in the municipality of  Mrkonjic Grad.

See also
List of lakes in Bosnia and Herzegovina

References

Lakes of Bosnia and Herzegovina